Siah Choqa or Seyah Cheqa or Siah Cheqa may refer to:
 Siah Choqa, Hamadan
 Siah Choqa, Kermanshah
 Siah Choqa, Sahneh, Kermanshah Province
 Siah Choqai (disambiguation)